Valeri Nikitin (born 28 November 1969) is an Estonian former wrestler who competed in the 1992 Summer Olympics, 1996 Summer Olympics and in the 2000 Summer Olympics.

References

External links
 

1969 births
Living people
Olympic wrestlers of Estonia
Wrestlers at the 1992 Summer Olympics
Wrestlers at the 1996 Summer Olympics
Wrestlers at the 2000 Summer Olympics
Estonian male sport wrestlers
Estonian people of Russian descent
20th-century Estonian people
21st-century Estonian people